Silbersee may refer to:

 Silbersee (Langenhagen), a lake in Germany
 Silbersee (Carinthia), a lake in Austria
Der Silbersee (The Silver Lake), a play with music by Kurt Weill